The 1957 West Virginia Mountaineers football team represented West Virginia University as a member of the Southern Conference (SoCon) during the 1957 NCAA University Division football season. Led by eighth-year head coach Art Lewis, the Mountaineers compiled an overall record of 7–2–1 with a mark of 3–0 in conference play, placing second in the SoCon.

Schedule

References

West Virginia
West Virginia Mountaineers football seasons
West Virginia Mountaineers football